By-elections to the 16th Canadian Parliament were held to elect members of the House of Commons of Canada between the 1926 federal election and the 1930 federal election. The Liberal Party of Canada led a minority government for the 16th Canadian Parliament.

The list includes Ministerial by-elections which occurred due to the requirement that Members of Parliament recontest their seats upon being appointed to Cabinet. These by-elections were almost always uncontested. This requirement was abolished in 1931.

See also
List of federal by-elections in Canada

Sources
 Parliament of Canada–Elected in By-Elections 

1930 elections in Canada
1929 elections in Canada
1928 elections in Canada
1927 elections in Canada
1926 elections in Canada
16th